John Maduka (born 27 September 1970 in Thyolo) is a retired Malawian footballer. He used to play for Bloemfontein Celtic until his retirement in 2009. He is currently the head coach of Durban, Chartswoth based club  Royal AM F.C

Career

John Maduka started his football career at 16. He played for his school Lilongwe Boys Primary School when his talent was spotted by Davie Saccur; coach and owner of Davie Cosmos. While playing for Davie Cosmos and Lilongwe Boys Primary School, in 1992 he attracted interest of Silver strikers and Mighty Limbe Leaf Wanderers. John opted for Silver Strikers as he did not want to leave his home town of Lilongwe.

He last played for Bloemfontein Celtic in South Africa, as a midfielder.

Maduka debuted for Malawi in a 0–4 loss against Zimbabwe in 1991. He has since made close to 90 appearances for The Flames.
He also played South African based team club Bloemfontein Celtic where he spent 5 years and made 118 appearances before retiring in 2009. He was the assistant coach at the club with Steve Komphela being the head coach and became coach of Bloemfontein Celtic in July 2020.

Clubs
2004–2009 Bloemfontein Celtic 118 apps, 6 goals
2003      Zulu Royals 25 apps, 1 goal
1997–2003 Bush Bucks 196 apps, 33 goals
1997      Preston North End 0 apps.
1995      Strindheim IL (on loan) 5 apps.
1992–1996 Silver Strikers 139 apps, 39 goals
1992–1996 Black Aces
1989–1992 Davie Cosmos

References

External links

1970 births
Living people
People from Thyolo District
Malawian footballers
Bush Bucks F.C. players
Bloemfontein Celtic F.C. players
Expatriate soccer players in South Africa
Expatriate footballers in Norway
Strindheim IL players
Malawian expatriate footballers
Eliteserien players
Malawian expatriate sportspeople in South Africa
Malawian expatriate sportspeople in Norway
Association football midfielders
Silver Strikers FC players
Malawi international footballers
Bloemfontein Celtic F.C. managers